Roberto Márquez may refer to:

 Roberto Márquez (painter) (born 1959), Mexican painter
 Roberto Márquez (field hockey), Argentine field hockey player
 Roberto Márquez (volleyball) (born 1981), Mexican volleyball player
 Roberto Márquez (musician) (born 1951), Chilean composer, singer and charanguist of Illapu